Weinrich is a German surname, and may refer to:

 Agnes Weinrich (1873–1946), American artist
 Carl Weinrich (1904–1991), American organist
 Eric Weinrich (born 1966), American ice hockey player
 Georg von Weinrich (1768–1836), Bavarian Lieutenant General and War Minister
 Harald Weinrich (born 1927), German classical scholar
 James D. Weinrich (born 1950), American sex researcher
 Jeth Weinrich (21st century), Canadian music video director and documentary filmmaker
 Johannes Weinrich (born 1947), German left-wing activist and convicted terrorist
 Karl Weinrich (1887–1973), German NSDAP Gauleiter
 Lorenz Weinrich (born 1929), German historian
 Scott Weinrich (born 1961), American musician

See also
 Weinreich